EBG may refer to:

 EBG Developments, a Chinese real estate developer
 Ebughu language
 Ecobank Ghana, a commercial bank
 Efficient Basing-Grafenwöhr, a United States Army installation in Germany
 El Bagre Airport, in Antioquia, Colombia
 Electromagnetic bandgap metamaterial
 ʻEneʻio Botanical Garden, in Tonga
 Epro Building Group, a Commercial & Residential Building Company
Engin Blindé du Génie, a French armoured engineering vehicle
 Eoghan Bán Gallagher, a Gaelic footballer
 Equity Bank Group, an African financial holding company
 Erzbischöfliches Gymnasium Beuel, now Kardinal-Frings-Gymnasium, a secondary school in Bonn, Germany